LyX (styled as LYX; pronounced ) is an open source, graphical user interface document processor based on the LaTeX typesetting system. Unlike most word processors, which follow the WYSIWYG ("what you see is what you get") paradigm, LyX has a WYSIWYM ("what you see is what you mean") approach, where what shows up on the screen roughly depicts the semantic structure of the page and is only an approximation of the document produced by TeX.

Since LyX relies on the typesetting system of LaTeX without being a full-fledged LaTeX editor itself, it has the power and flexibility of LaTeX, and can handle documents including books, notes, theses, academic papers, letters, etc. LyX's interface is structured so that while knowledge of the LaTeX markup language is not necessary for basic usage, new LaTeX directives can be added into the document to support more complex features during editing — though not at the level of full control a full-fledged LaTeX editor can provide.

LyX is popular among technical authors and scientists for its advanced mathematical modes, though it is increasingly used by non-mathematically-oriented scholars as well for its bibliographic database integration and its ability to manage multiple files. LyX has also become a popular publishing tool among self-publishers.

LyX is available for all major operating systems, including Windows, MacOS, Linux, UNIX, ChromeOS, OS/2 and Haiku. LyX can be redistributed and modified under the terms of the GNU General Public License and is thus free software.

Features

LyX is a fully featured document processor. It provides structured document creation and editing, branches for having different versions of the same document, master and child documents, change tracking, support for writing documents in many languages and scripts, spell checking, graphics and table editing. LyX provides automatically numbered headings, titles, and paragraphs, with document outline. It features a powerful mathematical formula editor with point-and-click or keyboard-only interface.

LyX has native support for many document classes and templates available in LaTeX through \documentclass{theclass}. User layouts and modules can be made for those missing. Text is laid out according to standard typographic rules, including ligatures, kerning, indents, spacing, and hyphenation. It provides BibTeX/BibLaTeX citation support, comprehensive cross-referencing and PDF hyperlinks.  LyX can import various common text formats.

Documents can be processed in LaTeX, PdfLaTeX, XeTeX and LuaTeX typesetting systems or exported to DocBook SGML, XHTML and plain text. Versioning is provided through external control systems like SVN, Git, RCS, and CVS.

LyX supports right-to-left languages like Arabic, Persian, and Hebrew, along with support for bi-directional text. Chinese, Japanese, and Korean languages are supported as well.

Documents can embed calculations via Octave or Computer Algebra Systems (CAS) like Maple, Maxima and Mathematica. Commands will be forwarded to the external programs and results will be embedded in the document.

History
Matthias Ettrich started developing a shareware program called Lyrix in 1995. It was then announced on Usenet, where it received a great deal of attention in the following years.

Shortly after the initial release, Lyrix was renamed to LyX due to a name clash with a word processor produced by the company Santa Cruz Operation. The name LyX was chosen because of the file suffix .lyx for Lyrix files.

Versions
LyX has no set release schedule. Releases occur when there are important bug fixes or significant improvements. The following table lists the dates of all major releases. For collaboration between different users using the same major release is recommended as LyX file format remains fixed within each major release (e.g. all minor LyX versions 2.3.0, 2.3.1, 2.3.2, ... use strictly the same file format). Although the current major release is 2.3.0, released in 2018, the current version, 2.3.7, dates from January 7, 2023.

See also

List of word processors
 Comparison of word processors
 Comparison of TeX editors
 Scientific WorkPlace – A proprietary software (non-free) counterpart to LyX

References

External links

LyX Wiki
A comparative review of Scientific WorkPlace and LyX in Journal of Statistical Software

1995 software
Cross-platform free software
Desktop publishing software
Formula editors
Free multilingual software
Free software programmed in C++
Free TeX editors
Free word processors
Linux TeX software
TeX editors
TeX editors that use Qt
TeX software for macOS
TeX software for Windows